Esen Air was an airline based in Bishkek, Kyrgyzstan. It started operations on 10 October 2006 and operated domestic and international charter services. The main base was at Manas International Airport, Bishkek.

Destinations
Kyrgyzstan
Bishkek (Manas International Airport)
Karakol (Karakol Airport)

Fleet
The Esen Air fleet included the following aircraft (at June 2009):

2 Boeing 737-200 operated by Avia Traffic Company

References

Defunct airlines of Kyrgyzstan
Airlines established in 2006
Airlines disestablished in 2008